

Lady of Mantua

House of Gonzaga, 1328–1433

Marchioness of Mantua

House of Gonzaga, 1433–1530

Duchess of Mantua

House of Gonzaga, 1530–1627

House of Gonzaga, Nevers line, 1627–1708

See also
List of consorts of Montferrat

Sources
NORTHERN ITALY: MANTUA

 
Mantua
House of Gonzaga
Mantuan, consorts